Ahl al Oughlam is an archaeological site and palaeontological site located just outside Casablanca, Morocco. It was discovered in 1985 and first excavated in 1989. Ahl al Oughlam is the richest late Neogene vertebrate locality of North Africa. It has also yielded the area's first important carnivore fauna, including 23 taxa, 13 of which are new.

See also
Taforalt

References

https://web.archive.org/web/20070205181619/http://www.ivry.cnrs.fr/deh/geraads/aao/wintro.htm

Archaeological sites in Morocco
Buildings and structures in Casablanca
Pliocene paleontological sites of Africa